John Blewitt (born 19 December 1945) is a British speed skater. He competed at the 1968 Winter Olympics and the 1972 Winter Olympics.

References

1945 births
Living people
British male speed skaters
Olympic speed skaters of Great Britain
Speed skaters at the 1968 Winter Olympics
Speed skaters at the 1972 Winter Olympics
People from Richmond, London